Scopula circumpunctata is a moth of the family Geometridae. It was described by Warren in 1898. It is endemic to South Africa.

References

Moths described in 1898
circumpunctata
Endemic moths of South Africa
Taxa named by William Warren (entomologist)